Live at the Café Carlyle is a 1984 live album by jazz pianist George Shearing accompanied by the double bassist and pianist Don Thompson.

Reception

Scott Yanow reviewed the album for Allmusic and wrote that "[Don] Thompson, who plays second piano on Herbie Hancock's "Tell Me a Bedtime Story," jams with strong intuition and consistent swing, easily picking up on Shearing's musical directions during such songs as "Pent up House," "The Shadow of Your Smile," "Cheryl" and a couple of originals", and concludes by writing that Shearing "...had his career rejuvenated during his years on Concord through stimulating musical encounters such as this one. Fine music".

Track listing 
 "Pent Up House" (Sonny Rollins) – 4:13
 "The Shadow of Your Smile" (Johnny Mandel, Paul Francis Webster) – 5:07
 "Teach Me Tonight" (Gene De Paul, Sammy Cahn) – 3:42
 "Cheryl" (Charlie Parker) – 4:55
 "Blues for Breakfast" (Jerry Gladstone, Matt Dennis) – 3:38
 "P.S. I Love You" (Gordon Jenkins, Johnny Mercer) – 2:47
 "I Cover the Waterfront" (Edward Heyman, Johnny Green) – 5:24
 "Tell Me a Bedtime Story" (Herbie Hancock) – 4:20
 "Inside" (Jack Reardon, Marvin Fisher) – 4:57
 "Stratford Stomp" (Don Thompson) – 3:32

Personnel 
George Shearing – piano, vocals, liner notes
Don Thompson – double bass, piano, liner notes
Production
Ed Trabanco – recording engineer
Phil Edwards – remix engineer
Elliott Gerber – art direction
Carl Jefferson – producer
George Horn – mastering
Ken Howard – photography

References

1984 live albums
Albums produced by Carl Jefferson
Concord Records live albums
George Shearing live albums